The Boeing B-47 Stratojet was operational with the United States Air Force Strategic Air Command beginning in May 1951 with the first operational B-47Bs to the 306th Bombardment Wing, Medium, based at MacDill AFB, Florida.

In March 1961, President John F. Kennedy directed the phaseout of the B-47. However this was delayed in July by the onset of the Berlin crisis of 1961–62. In the following years, B-47s were gradually delivered to the Military Aircraft Storage and Disposition Center (MASDC) at Davis-Monthan AFB.

Strategic Air Command B-47 Bombardment Wings were divided among the Second, Eighth and Fifteenth Air Forces.  This list is of the units B-47s were assigned to, and the bases at which they were stationed .

B-47 Medium Bombardment units
The first operational B-47B Medium bombers were delivered to SAC in July 1951 to the 306th Bombardment Wing, MacDill AFB, Florida.  SAC's last two B-47E bombers went to storage on 11 February 1966 from the 98th Bombardment Wing, Lincoln AFB, Nebraska.

Operational medium bomber versions of the Stratojet were B-47B (1951–1953) and B-47E (1953–1957).  B-47Bs were modified to B-47E specifications beginning in 1953 to 1957.   By 1957, the B-47Bs had effectively ceased to exist, having been brought up to the B-47E standard.  These modified B-47Bs are sometimes known as B-47B-II, although this was not an official Air Force designation. Outwardly, they could be distinguished from B-47Es only by their serial numbers.

 2d Bombardment Wing, Hunter AFB, Georgia
 Second Air Force, 25 Nov 19531 Apr 1963, B-47E
 20th Bombardment Squadron
 49th Bombardment Squadron
 96th Bombardment Squadron
 429th Bombardment Squadron (1958–1962)*
 Wing transferred to Barksdale AFB, Louisiana in 1963; 20th BS converted to B-52F Stratofortress
 9th Bombardment Wing,  Mountain Home AFB, Idaho
 Fifteenth Air Force, 1 Nov 195215 Mar 1963, B-47B/E; EB-47E**
 1st Bombardment Squadron
 5th Bombardment Squadron
 99th Bombardment Squadron
 658th Bombardment Squadron (1958–1962)*
 Wing transferred to Beale AFB, California in 1966; 1st and 99th BS converted to Lockheed SR-71 Blackbird
 19th Bombardment Wing
 Pinecastle AFB, Florida, Jun 1954 – Jul 1956
 Homestead AFB,  Florida, Jul 1956 – Jan 1961
 Second Air Force, 11 Jun 19541 Jan 1961, B-47E
 28th Bombardment Squadron
 30th Bombardment Squadron (to 4133d SW, B-52H in 1961)
 93d Bombardment Squadron  (to 4239th SW, B-52H in 1961)
 659th Bombardment Squadron (1958–1961)*
 Converted to B-52F Stratofortress in 1962
 22d Bombardment Wing,  March AFB, California
 Fifteenth Air Force, 1 Nov 195215 Mar 1963, B-47B/E
 2d Bombardment Squadron
 19th Bombardment Squadron
 33d Bombardment Squadron
 408th Bombardment Squadron (1959–1962)*
 Converted to B-52B Stratofortress in 1963
 40th Bombardment Wing
 Smoky Hill (later Schilling) AFB, Kansas, 28 May 195220 Jun 1960
 Forbes AFB,     Kansas, 20 Jun 19601 Sep 1965
 Fifteenth Air Force (1952–1960), Second Air Force, 1960–1964, B-47E
 25th Bombardment Squadron
 44th Bombardment Squadron
 45th Bombardment Squadron
 660th Bombardment Squadron (1959–1960)
 Inactivated 1 September 1964
 43d Bombardment Wing,  Davis-Monthan AFB, Arizona
 Fifteenth Air Force, 25 Sep 195315 Mar 1960, B-47E
 63d Bombardment Squadron
 64th Bombardment Squadron
 65th Bombardment Squadron
 403d Bombardment Squadron (1958–1960)*
 Converted to B-58 Hustler at Carswell AFB, Texas in 1960
 44th Bombardment Wing
 Lake Charles (later Chennault) AFB, Louisiana
 Second Air Force, 25 Apr 195315 Jun 1960, B-47B/E
 66th Bombardment Squadron
 67th Bombardment Squadron
 68th Bombardment Squadron
 506th Bombardment Squadron (1958–1960)*
 Inactivated 15 June 1960; became 44th Strategic Missile Wing at Ellsworth
 68th Bombardment Wing
 Lake Charles (later Chennault) AFB, Louisiana
 Second Air Force, 25 Oct 195315 Apr 1963, B-47E
 51st Bombardment Squadron
 52d Bombardment Squadron
 656th Bombardment Squadron
 657th Bombardment Squadron (1958–1963)*
 Wing transferred to Seymour Johnson AFB, North Carolina in 1963; 51st BS converted to B-52G Stratofortress
 93d Bombardment Wing,  Castle AFB, California
 Fifteenth Air Force, 15 Apr 19541 Feb 1955, B-47E
 328th Bombardment Squadron
 329th Bombardment Squadron
 330th Bombardment Squadron
 Functioned as a SAC Training Wing – Not Operational; Wing converted to B-52B Stratofortress in 1956
 96th Bombardment Wing
 Second Air Force, Altus AFB, Oklahoma, 18 Nov 19533 Sep 1957, B-47E
 Fifteenth Air Force, Dyess AFB, Texas, 4 Sep 195718 Mar 1963, B-47E
 337th Bombardment Squadron
 338th Bombardment Squadron
 339th Bombardment Squadron
 413th Bombardment Squadron (1958–1961)*
 Converted to B-52E Stratofortress in 1962
 97th Bombardment Wing, Biggs AFB, Texas
 Fifteenth Air Force, 1 Apr 19551 Oct 1959, B-47E
 340th Bombardment Squadron
 341st Bombardment Squadron (to 4038th SW, B-52G in 1960)
 342d Bombardment Squadron  (to 4137th SW, B-52G in 1960)
 Wing transferred to Blytheville AFB, Arkansas in 1959; 340th BS converted to B-52G Stratofortress
 98th Bombardment (later Strategic Aerospace) Wing
 Lincoln AFB, Nebraska, B-47E
 Fifteenth Air Force, 15 Oct 195431 Dec 1958 (98th BMW)
 Second Air Force, 1 Jan 195925 Jun 1966 (98th SAW after 1 Feb 1964)
 343d Bombardment Squadron
 344th Bombardment Squadron
 345th Bombardment Squadron
 415th Bombardment Squadron (1958–1962)*
 Inactivated 25 June 1966
 100th Bombardment Wing
 Portsmouth (later, Pease) AFB, New Hampshire
 Eighth Air Force, 1 Jan 195625 Jun 1966, B-47E
 349th Bombardment Squadron
 350th Bombardment Squadron
 351st Bombardment Squadron
 418th Bombardment Squadron (1959–1962)*
 Wing transferred to Davis-Monthan AFB, Arizona in 1966; converted to Lockheed U-2
 301st Bombardment Wing, Lockbourne AFB, Ohio
 Second Air Force, 20 Jun 195315 Apr 1958
 Eighth Air Force, 16 Apr 195815 Jun 1964
 B-47B/E, 1953–1958, 1958–1961; RB-47, 1958; EB-47E**, 1961–1964
 32d Bombardment Squadron
 352d Bombardment Squadron
 353d Bombardment Squadron
 419th Bombardment Squadron (1958–1961)*
 Became KC-135 Air Refueling Wing in 1964
 303d Bombardment Wing, Davis-Monthan AFB, Arizona
 Fifteenth Air Force, 20 Jan 195315 Jun 1964, B-47B/E
 358th Bombardment Squadron
 359th Bombardment Squadron
 360th Bombardment Squadron
 427th Bombardment Squadron (1958–1961)*
 Inactivated 15 June 1964

 305th Bombardment Wing
 Fifteenth Air Force, MacDill AFB, Florida, 15 Apr 195215 Feb 1961, B-47B/E
 Second Air Force, Bunker Hill AFB, Indiana, 16 Feb 19611 Apr 1963, B-47E
 364th Bombardment Squadron
 365th Bombardment Squadron
 366th Bombardment Squadron
 422d Bombardment Squadron (1960–1961)
 Converted to B-58 Hustler in 1961
 306th Bombardment (later Strategic Aerospace) Wing, MacDill AFB, Florida
 Second Air Force, 306th BMW, 2 Apr 19511 Jan 1959, B-47A/B/E***
 Second Air Force, 306th SAW, 1 Jan 19591 Apr 1963, B-47E
 367th Bombardment Squadron
 368th Bombardment Squadron
 369th Bombardment Squadron
 423d Bombardment Squadron (1959–1962)*
 Wing transferred to McCoy AFB, Florida in 1963; 367th BS converted to B-52D Stratofortress
 307th Bombardment Wing, Lincoln AFB, Nebraska
 Fifteenth Air Force, 8 Nov 195430 Dec 1958, B-47E
 Second Air Force, 31 Dec 195825 Jun 1965, B-47E; EB-47L (1962-1964)
 370th Bombardment Squadron
 371st Bombardment Squadron
 372d Bombardment Squadron
 424th Bombardment Squadron (1958–1961)*
 Inactivated 25 March 1965
 308th Bombardment Wing, Hunter AFB, Georgia
 Second Air Force, 25 Sep 195225 Jun 1961, B-47B/E
 373d Bombardment Squadron
 374th Bombardment Squadron
 375th Bombardment Squadron
 425th Bombardment Squadron (1958–1961)*
 Became non-operational 15 Jul 1959; Wing transferred to Little Rock AFB, Arkansas and converted to LGM-25C Titan II ICBMs (373d 374th SMS) in 1963.
 310th Bombardment Wing, Smoky Hill (later Schilling) AFB, Kansas
 Second Air Force, 10 May 195430 Dec 1958, B-47E
 Fifteenth Air Force, 31 Dec 195825 Feb 1965, B-47E
 379th Bombardment Squadron
 380th Bombardment Squadron
 381st Bombardment Squadron
 428th Bombardment Squadron (1959–1962)*
 Inactivated 25 June 1965
 320th Bombardment Wing, March AFB, California
 Fifteenth Air Force, 23 Jul 195315 Sep 1960
 YRB-47B, 1953+; B-47E, 1953–1960
 441st Bombardment Squadron
 442d Bombardment Squadron
 443d Bombardment Squadron
 444th Bombardment Squadron (1959–1960)*
 Converted to B-52F Stratofortress (441st BS) in 1963
 321st Bombardment Wing, Pinecastle (later McCoy) AFB, Florida
 Second Air Force, 15 Dec 19531 Jan 1959, B-47B/E
 Eighth Air Force, 1 Jan 195925 Oct 1961, B-47E
 445th Bombardment Squadron
 446th Bombardment Squadron
 447th Bombardment Squadron
 448th Bombardment Squadron
 Inactivated 25 October 1961
 340th Bombardment Wing, Sedalia (later Whiteman) AFB, Missouri
 Fifteenth Air Force, 8 Aug 195330 Dec 1958
 Second Air Force, 31 Dec 19581 Sep 1963
 YRB-47B, 1954-1955+; B-47E, 1955–1963
 486th Bombardment Squadron
 487th Bombardment Squadron
 488th Bombardment Squadron
 489th Bombardment Squadron (1958–1962)*
 Inactivated 1 September 1963
 341st Bombardment Wing, Abiline (Later Dyess AFB), Texas
 Fifteenth Air Force, 1 Sep 195525 Jun 1961, B-47E
 10th Bombardment Squadron
 12th Bombardment Squadron
 490th Bombardment Squadron
 491st Bombardment Squadron (1958–1961)*
 Inactivated 25 Jun 1961
 376th Bombardment Wing,
 Second Air Force,  Barksdale AFB, Louisiana, 23 Feb 195414 Nov 1957, B-47E
 Eighth Air Force, Lockbourne AFB, Ohio, 15 Nov 195715 Mar 1955, B-47E, 1957–1961; EB-47L++, 1961–1965
 512th Bombardment Squadron
 513th Bombardment Squadron
 514th Bombardment Squadron
 515th Bombardment Squadron (1958–1961)*
 Inactivated 15 March 1965
 379th Bombardment Wing, Homestead AFB, Florida
 Second Air Force, 1 Nov 19551 Jan 1959, B-47E
 524th Bombardment Squadron
 525th Bombardment Squadron (to 4136th SW, B-52H in 1961)
 526th Bombardment Squadron (to 4042d SW, B-52H in 1961)
 527th Bombardment Squadron (1958–1959)*
 Transferred to Wurtsmith AFB, Michigan; converted to  B-52H Stratofortress (524 BS) in 1961
 380th Bombardment Wing, Plattsburgh AFB, New York
 Second Air Force, 1 Jul 195525 Jun 1965
 B-47E, 1955–; EB-47E** 1962–1964
 528th Bombardment Squadron
 529th Bombardment Squadron
 530th Bombardment Squadron
 531st Bombardment Squadron (1959–1961)*
 Converted to B-52G Stratofortress (528th BS) in 1966
 384th Bombardment Wing, Little Rock AFB, Arkansas
 Second Air Force, 1 Aug 19552 Apr 1966, B-47E
 544th Bombardment Squadron
 545th Bombardment Squadron
 546th Bombardment Squadron
 547th Bombardment Squadron (1958–1961)*
 Inactivated 1 September 1964
 509th Bombardment Wing
 Fifteenth Air Force, Walker AFB, New Mexico, 1 Jul 195530 Jun 1958, B-47E
 Eighth Air Force,  Pease AFB, New Hampshire, 1 Jul 19582 Apr 1966, B-47E
 393d Bombardment Squadron
 715th Bombardment Squadron
 830th Bombardment Squadron
 661st Bombardment Squadron (1959–1962)*
 Converted to B-52D Stratofortress (393d BS) in 1966

.* Activated as a result of the SAC phaseout and consolidated of B-47 units as the Stratojet began being replaced by B-52.

.** Three modified 55th SRW B-47Es (53-2315, 53-2316 and 53-2320) from Forbes AFB were modified and redesignated as EB-47E Tell Twos. Deployed to a SAC Detachment (TUSLOG Det-50) at Incirlik AB, Turkey to monitor the telemetry broadcast during Soviet space launches from the IRBM facility at Kapustin Yar and the space center at Tyuratam.  In service from 1958 until about 1967.  In addition, the 301st BW and 380th BW also operated EB-47Es which were electronics countermeasure conversions of the standard B-47E.  Not much is known about the USAF EB-47E program.

.*** The B-47As of the 306th BW were primarily training aircraft and were not considered as being combat ready.  None of the B-47As ever saw any operational duty, and were withdrawn from active service by 1953, being replaced by B-47Bs.

.+ Equipped with the YRB-47B conversion of the B-47B, specifically intended for the training of crews for RB-47Es.  Later converted to B-47E Bomber Configuration by March 1955

.++ 376th BW EB-47Ls were modified B-47Es used as an electronics communications aircraft which served as relay stations between other aircraft (such as the USAF "Looking Glass" EC-135) or between aircraft and ground stations during and after a nuclear attack.

RB-47 Strategic Reconnaissance units

The RB-47 was designed to replace the RB-29 and RB-50 Superfortress aircraft which were serving in the long-range photo-reconnaissance role but which were rapidly approaching obsolescence.  The RB-47 carried out many ferret missions around the periphery of Soviet territory, and sometimes inside on penetration flights to map planned routes for B-52s if combat missions over the Soviet Union ever became necessary.  The reconnaissance production model was the RB-47E, with USAF deliveries beginning in 1953. The last of 255 RB-47Es were delivered in August 1955.

The YRB-47B was a prototype conversion of the B-47B specifically intended for the training of crews for RB-47Es. Delays in delivering the RB-47E, led to 90 B-47's being converted to an interim reconnaissance fit with an 8 camera bomb-bay pod.  The 91st Strategic Reconnaissance Wing received its first YRB-47B in April 1953, the 26th Strategic Reconnaissance Wing three  months later, using them until they were swapped for the new RB-47E in 1954.

The RB-47H was an electronic reconnaissance and countermeasures version, with 35 aircraft being manufactured and delivered to the 55th Strategic Reconnaissance Wing at Forbes AFB, Kansas in August 1955.  A specialized version, the ERB-47H was a dedicated electronic ferret modification of three aircraft.

Fifteen RB-47Ks (53-426 to 53-4279) were also operated by the 55th SRW, 338th SRS. The RB-47K differed from the RB-47E by the addition of high-resolution, side-looking radars (SLAR) and air sampling equipment.  It was used as an airborne weather information gathering system which would fly near the Soviet Border and sampling the radioactive fallout from nuclear tests.  These were among the last Stratojets built.

Phaseout of the RB-47E began in October 1957, but the aircraft remained in service for another decade, with the last SAC B-47, a RB-47H (53-4296) of the 55th SRW was flown to Davis Monthan AFB for storage on 29 December 1967.  These models were replaced with the Lockheed U-2 and SR-71 strategic reconnaissance aircraft.

 26th Strategic Reconnaissance Wing
 Lockbourne AFB, Ohio
 2d Air Force, 9 May 195230 Jun 1955
 8th Air Force, 1 Jul 19551 Jul 1958
 YRB-47 (1953–1954); RB-47B* (1953–1954); RB-47E (1954–1958), B-47E (1958)
 3d Strategic Reconnaissance Squadron
 4th Strategic Reconnaissance Squadron
 10th Strategic Reconnaissance Squadron
 Wing inactivated 1 July 1958
 55th Strategic Reconnaissance Wing
 15th Air Force, Ramey AFB, Puerto Rico (1950–1954)
 Wing converted to Boeing RB-47's in 1954 upon Txfer from Ramey
 15th Air Force, Forbes AFB, Kansas, (1954–1967)
 ERB-47H, RB-47H (1954–1967), RB-47K (1955–1962)
 38th Strategic Reconnaissance Squadron
 338th Strategic Reconnaissance Squadron
 343d Strategic Reconnaissance Squadron
 Wing converted to Boeing RC-135s in 1968
 70th Strategic Reconnaissance Wing, Little Rock AFB, Arkansas
 2d Air Force, 24 Jan 195525 Jun 1962
 RB-47E (1955–1961), B-47E (1961–1962)
 6th Strategic Reconnaissance Squadron
 26th Strategic Reconnaissance (later 681st Bombardment) Squadron
 Converted to B-47E medium bombers in late 1961; inactivated in 1962.

 90th Strategic Reconnaissance Wing
 15th Air Force, Forbes AFB, Kansas (1954–1960)
 RB-47E, 1954–1960
 319th Strategic Reconnaissance Squadron
 320th Strategic Reconnaissance Squadron
 321st Strategic Reconnaissance Squadron
 Wing inactivated 20 June 1960
 91st Strategic Reconnaissance Wing
 2d Air Force, Lockbourne AFB, Ohio
 YRB-47, RB-47E (1953–1957)
 322d Strategic Reconnaissance Squadron
 323d Strategic Reconnaissance Squadron
 324th Strategic Reconnaissance Squadron
 Wing inactivated 8 November 1957

.* RB-47Bs were operated during 1953–54 by the 26th SRW. Unlike the later RB-47E, the RB-47B could only provide daylight photographic coverage

WB-47E Weather Reconnaissance units

WB-47E was the designation assigned to converted SAC B-47E medium bombers used for weather reconnaissance by the Air Weather Service (AWS). They had nose-mounted cameras that recorded cloud formations, and they carried air-sampling and data recording equipment inside a sensor pod in the bomb bay.
 53d Weather Reconnaissance Squadron, Hunter AFB, Georgia (1963–1966); Ramey AFB, Puerto Rico, (1966–1969)
 55th Weather Reconnaissance Squadron, McClellan AFB, California, 1963–1969
 57th Weather Reconnaissance Squadron Hickam AFB Hawaii xxxx–1969       
The first of 34 WB-47Es was delivered to the AWS on 20 March 1963.  The last operational USAF B-47 to fly was WB-47E-75-BW (51-7066) of the 57th Weather Reconnaissance Squadron on 30 October 1969. It was flown from Hickam AFB, Hawaii to Boeing Field, Washington, where subsequently it was restored to its SAC configuration and put on display at the Seattle Museum of Flight where it resides today.
The aircraft was flown from Hickam AFB by Lt. Col Bill Payton and Major Ray Hamilton.

4-Digit Training Units
B-47 training was originally planned to have been performed at Wichita AFB, Kansas, with Boeing manufacturing the aircraft on one side of the base as a joint tenant beginning in 1951.  However a variety of problems converting the Wichita Municipal Airport to an Air Force Base kept training from being performed there until 1954.   To accommodate B-47 training, Air Training Command activated Pinecastle AFB, Florida, on 10 September 1951 for B-47 training, however the training did not begin until early 1952 with the activation of the 3540th Combat Crew Training Wing.
 3540th Combat Crew Training Wing (ATC) (10 Jan 19521 Jan 1954)
 TB-47B, B-47B, 1952–1954
 3542d Combat Crew (later Flying Training) Training Squadron
 3544th Combat Crew (later Flying Training) Training Squadron
 Replaced by : 4240th Flying Training Wing (SAC) (1 Jan30 May 1954), Pinecastle AFB, Florida

B-47 crew training was moved from Pinecastle AFB to McConnell AFB in 1954; conducted under Air Training Command until 30 Dec 1958 when was reassigned to SAC.  With the reassignment of the crew training wing, operational transition training on the B-47 began at Pinecastle with the 321st Bombardment Wing.
 3520th Combat Crew Training Wing (ATC) (7 Jun 19511 Jan 1959)
 3520th Combat Crew Training Squadron, 26 Oct 19541 Jul 1958
 3521st Combat Crew Training Squadron, 26 Oct 19548 Sep 1955
 3522d (later 4347th) Combat Crew Training Squadron, 26 Oct 195431 Dec 1958
 3523d (later 4348th) Combat Crew Training Squadron, 26 Oct 195431 Dec 1958
 3525th Combat Crew Training Squadron, 26 Oct 19548 Sep 1955
 3526th Combat Crew Training Squadron, 26 Oct 195431 Dec 1958

 Replaced by: 4347th Combat Crew Training Wing (SAC), (1 Jan 195915 Jun 1963) McConnell AFB, Kansas
 TB-47B, B-47B, 1954–1963

 4347th Combat Crew Training Squadron, 1 Jan 195915 Jun 1963
 4348th Combat Crew Training Squadron, 1 Jan 195915 Jun 1963
 4349th Combat Crew Training Squadron, 1 Jan 195915 Jun 1963
 4350th Combat Crew Training Squadron, 1 Sep 195915 Jun 1962

Crew training on the B-47 ended in June 1963 as part of the planned aircraft phaseout and retirement.

References

 Manning, Thomas A. (2005), History of Air Education and Training Command, 1942–2002.  Office of History and Research, Headquarters, AETC, Randolph AFB, Texas  (Training Units)
  (Squadron Lookups)
 Mueller, Robert, Air Force Bases Volume I, Active Air Force Bases Within the United States of America on 17 September 1982, Office of Air Force History, 1989  (McConnell AFB section)
 Ravenstein, Charles A. Air Force Combat Wings Lineage and Honors Histories, 1947–1977. Maxwell AFB, Alabama: Office of Air Force History, 1984. . (Wing Lookups)
  55th WRS lineage and history
 Air Weather Reconnaissance Organization (WB-47E Weather Reconnaissance units)

1950s United States bomber aircraft
United States military aircraft
Military units and formations of the United States Air Force by equipment